Underworld is the fifth serial of the 15th season of the British science fiction television series Doctor Who, which was first broadcast in four weekly parts on BBC1 from 7–28 January 1978.

In the serial, the crew of an alien Minyan spaceship go on a hundred-thousand-year quest in search of a ship containing a genetic bank that would restore the Minyans' species.

Plot
In the history of the Time Lords, their involvement with the Minyans of Minyos is regarded as a disaster. The Minyans looked on them as gods but, having learnt much from their science, later expelled the Time Lords, who thereafter adopted a policy of non-intervention. The Minyans resented the Time Lords for their dominion over Minyos. Subsequently, the Minyans engaged in a civil war, using the advanced weapons the Time Lords gave them. In the final conflict, the Minyans destroyed their world. Two ships left Minyos before the final conflict, one carrying the race bank of the Minyans, the other intended to find the race bank and bring the Minyans to a new homeworld - Minyos II. The Minyan civilisation retained some Time Lord gifts, including cellular rejuvenation and the use of pacifier guns to alter the mental state of the aggressor.

At the edge of the expanding universe, the TARDIS materialises on a Minyan ship, the R1C. The Fourth Doctor, Leela and K9 visit the bridge of the ship. The crew – Jackson, Herrick, Orfe and Tala – are on a quest (“The Quest is the Quest”) that has taken many millennia and they have rejuvenated many times. Their aim is to find the missing ship, the P7E, which disappeared en route to Minyos II while carrying the genetic race banks of the entire species. They have finally traced the P7E’s signal and head into a spiral nebula to locate the ship. In the process the R1C is nearly destroyed, and is almost transformed into the core of a planetoid as small space rocks are attracted to it. A similar fate actually seems to have happened to the P7E, which is found at the centre of a small planet. The R1C crashes into this planet.

Civilisation on the P7E planetoid has taken a curious turn. Most of the population, the Trogs, live as slaves digging rock for fuel and sustenance, but they are culled and killed in rock collapses called Skyfalls. This situation is overseen by guards who are in turn responsible to two robots called Seers. In overall control is the Oracle, a powerful super-computer which has shaped the perverse society. Evidently the P7E became trapped in the planet millennia earlier and the entire basis of the mission was lost over time. The Doctor and Leela encounter Idas, a young man nearly killed in a Skyfall, learning how the local population is managed and terrorised. The Seers and Oracle exist in a protected Citadel at the heart of the planetoid (clearly the P7E) and the Doctor, Leela and Idas venture there, in the process rescuing Idas’ father Idmon who was due to be sacrificed to the Oracle. Other slaves are freed too, and flee to the R1C where Jackson makes them welcome. However, the crucial race banks remain in the control of the Oracle. The Doctor, Leela, and Idas venture to the Citadel to get the precious cargo. However, the Seers have meanwhile captured Herrick and give him what he thinks are the two race banks to take back to his ship. Jackson, Orfe and Tala are overjoyed, little realising that their friend has actually brought fission bombs back to the R1C.

The Doctor makes it to the core of the Citadel and confronts the Oracle. He succeeds in locating and stealing the real race banks and then heads off with Leela and Idas to get back to the probe ship. The Doctor gives the real race banks to Jackson, and then takes the fakes out of the craft. Idas takes advantage of the situation to round up the other Trogs and lead them to the safety of the R1C, while the Doctor engineers the return of the fission grenades to the Oracle. With moments to spare, the R1C blasts away, loaded with the slaves and the race banks, and is pushed outward from the planetoid by the explosion of the fission grenades. The TARDIS crew depart, wishing the Minyans well as they journey on to Minyos II, their quest complete.

Production
Underworld was recorded entirely in-studio in October 1977. In an attempt to save money on production costs, the serial was recorded using the Colour Separation Overlay (CSO) technique. This approach involves recording the actors against a bluescreen, and then superimposing them on models of the sets – thus saving on the costs involved in set construction.

Background
The serial borrows many elements and parallels from Greek mythology, in much the same way as the later The Horns of Nimon. In particular, the story draws on the tale of Jason and the Argonauts. References include the "Minyan" race (related to the Minoans), the search for "P7E" (Persephone), and character names such as Jackson ("Jason"), Orfe ("Orpheus"), Herrick ("Heracles"), Tala ("Talaus"), Idmon and Idas. The connection is highlighted at the end of the episode, with the Doctor likening Jackson and his journey to Jason and his quest for the Golden Fleece.

Broadcast and reception

Paul Cornell, Martin Day, and Keith Topping wrote of the serial in The Discontinuity Guide (1995), "The direction is a bit lazy, and the design could be better ... The plot settles down to be dullish, but much more worthy than its reputation would suggest. The CSO's not that bad, either." In The Television Companion (1998), David J. Howe and Stephen James Walker noted the bad reputation the serial had, but felt that it was better than that and a good example of the era. They praised the extra level the story takes by offering comparisons to Greek mythology, as well as the model work and CSO. In 2010, Patrick Mulkern of Radio Times panned the story and its "vapid characterisation, dodgy science and a dearth of anything dramatically engaging". While he liked some scenes and also found the visual effects good, he did not feel that compensated for the unengaging story and lack of comedic direction.

Commercial releases

In print

A novelisation of this serial, written by Terrance Dicks, was published by Target Books in January 1980 under the title Doctor Who and the Underworld. The novelisation opens with a lengthy history of the Minyans and the P7-E.

Home media
Underworld was released on VHS in March 2002. It was released on the U.S. iTunes Store in August 2008. The story was released on 29 March 2010 in a DVD box set called "Myths and Legends" along with the Third Doctor serial The Time Monster and the Fourth Doctor serial The Horns of Nimon. It was released individually in Region 1 on 7 July 2010.

References

External links

Target novelisation

1978 British television episodes
1980 British novels
1980 science fiction novels
Classical mythology in popular culture
Doctor Who serials novelised by Terrance Dicks
Fourth Doctor serials
Television episodes written by Bob Baker (scriptwriter)